The Concord label Rounder Records through the Rounder Kids imprint has released 3 soundtracks of the 1996 animated television series Arthur.

Arthur and Friends: The First Almost Real Not Live CD (or Tape)

Arthur and Friends: The First Almost Real Not Live CD was the first album for the series, issued in October 1998. Many of the songs on this CD aired in shorter forms on the TV episode "Arthur's Almost Live Not Real Music Festival." Others were heard at other times on the program and some were never seen on the TV show. Tracks on this CD included the show's main title theme, "Library Card," multiple tracks of D.W.'s favorite song "Crazy Bus," (by former show writer/executive story editor Joe Fallon), "Leftovers Goulash" (which utilizes a range of classic music and opera compositions, most notably the Hungarian Rhapsody No. 2), "The Ballad of Buster Baxter," (a more complete form than that heard on the television story) and "Jekyll and Hyde."

Track list
"Believe in Yourself (A Wonderful Kind Of Day)" by Ziggy Marley and the Melody Makers - 1:50
"Library Card" - 2:50
"Crazy Bus (No Way!)" by Michael Yarmush as Arthur Read and Michael Caloz as D.W. Read - 0:20
"Arthur vs. the Piano" by Michael Yarmush as Arthur Read, with Daniel Brochu as Buster Baxter - 2:55
"The UFO Song" as Daniel Brochu as Buster Baxter - 2:07
"Meek for a Week" by Jodie Resther as Francine Frensky - 3:16
"Jekyll and Hyde" by Luke Reid as Alan "The Brain" Powers - 3:24
"My Dog Pal" by Michael Yarmush as Arthur Read, Michael Caloz as D.W. Read, Daniel Brochu as Buster Baxter, Luke Reid as Alan "The Brain" Powers, Jodie Resther as Francine Frensky, and Susan Glover as Mrs. Wood - 4:03
"Matalii ja Mustii (The Binky Song)" by Värttinä - 2:45
"Crazy Bus (I Said No, D.W.!)" by Michael Yarmush as Arthur Read and Michael Caloz as D. W. Read - 0:13
"My Night Light" by Bruce Dinsmore as Binky Barnes, with Daniel Brochu as Buster Baxter - 2:54
"Go to Sleep" by Michael Caloz as D.W. Read - 2:24
"Thinking Tune" by Luke Reid as Alan "The Brain" Powers - 0:42
"Lucky Pencil" by Michael Yarmush as Arthur Read - 3:23
"Homework" by Arthur Holden as Mr. Ratburn and Daniel Brochu as Buster Baxter - 2:20
"Poetry Club" by Daniel Brochu as Buster Baxter, Jodie Resther as Francine Frensky, Michael Yarmush as Arthur Read, and Michael Caloz as D.W. Read - 2:03
"The Ballad of Buster Baxter" by Art Garfunkel - 2:14
"Leftovers Goulash" by Bruce Dinsmore as David Read, Michael Yarmush as Arthur Read, and Michael Caloz as D.W. Read - 2:11
"Crazy Bus (What's This Doing Here?!)" by Joe Fallon - 1:47

Arthur's Perfect Christmas

Arthur's Perfect Christmas features many songs from the television special, including "Boogie Woogie Christmas" and "Baxter Day". The CD also contains songs that were either heard on the television special as instrumentals or not featured at all.

Track list
"Perfect Christmas"
"Jingle Bells"
"The First Noel"
"Boogie Woogie Christmas" (Holliday:14)(Can. 7)
"Here We Come A-wassailing"
"O Little Town of Bethlehem"
"Silent Night"
"Fum, Fum, Fum"
"It's Kwanzaa Time!"
"What Child Is This?"
"What's the Use of Presents?"
"Baxter Day"
"I'm Not Scared of Santa"
"We Three Kings"
"Chanukah, Oh Chanukah"
"Sevivon"
"Chanukah Blessing"
"Santa Lucia"
"Nu Är Det Jul Igen" (Swedish for "Now It's Christmas Again")
"Angels We Have Heard on High"
"Bring a Torch, Jeanette, Isabella"
"It Came Upon a Midnight Clear"
"O Tannenbaum"
"Joy to the World"
"Perfect Christmas Reprise"

Arthur's Really Rockin' Music Mix

The most recent CD, Arthur's Really Rockin' Music Mix was released on September 11, 2001. This CD contains only one song heard on the program, a remixed version of the main title theme. A short version of this remix was played during the closing credits in the sixth season. All other tunes on this album are new. They are intended as a mix of various song styles, including zydeco, tango, jazz, blues and even country western. Songs include "Two Sides of the Story" (the country western song, a tune based on the events of the story "Arthur's Family Feud"), "Fern's Detective Tango" (based loosely on the story "Binky Rules") and "D.W.'s Brass in Pocket" (a cover of the Pretenders song "Brass in Pocket"). There is also a retelling of the story of "Goldilocks and the Three Bears" by Sue Ellen, featuring Binky as Baby Bear, with lines such as "I don't feel like a baby. Can't I be their cousin from down south who's a professional race car driver?"

Track list
"Believe in Yourself" (Arthur Theme Remix)
"I Don't Want to Wake Up"
"Pop Quiz from Ratburn"
"Has Anybody Seen My Invisible Friend?"
"Two Sides of the Story"
"I Can't Snap My Fingers"
"Fly, Butterfly, Fly!"
"D.W.'s Brass in Pocket"
"Elwood City: A Report"
"Muffy's Soccer Song"
"My Brain"
"Only the Frensky"
"Mrs. Wha-cha-ma-call-it"
"Fern's Detective Tango"
"My Echo Doesn't Sound Like Me"
"Goldilocks and The Bears Trio as Told by Sue Ellen"

References 

Television animation soundtracks
Rounder Records soundtracks
Film and television discographies
1998 soundtrack albums
2000 soundtrack albums
2001 soundtrack albums
Lists of soundtracks